Pre-mRNA-processing factor 6 is a protein that in humans is encoded by the PRPF6 gene.

The protein encoded by this gene appears to be involved in pre-mRNA splicing, possibly acting as a bridging factor between U5 and U4/U6 snRNPs in formation of the spliceosome. The encoded protein also can bind androgen receptor, providing a link between transcriptional activation and splicing.

Interactions
PRPF6 has been shown to interact with TXNL4B, ARAF and Androgen receptor.

References

Further reading

External links
  GeneReviews/NCBI/NIH/UW entry on Retinitis Pigmentosa Overview

Spliceosome